Latisha Chan and Martina Hingis were the defending champions, but Hingis retired from professional tennis at the end of 2017. Chan played alongside Bethanie Mattek-Sands, but lost in the quarterfinals to Andrea Sestini Hlaváčková and Barbora Strýcová.

Ekaterina Makarova and Elena Vesnina won the title, defeating Tímea Babos and Kristina Mladenovic in the final, 2–6, 6–4, [10–8].

Seeds
The top four seeds received a bye into the second round.

Draw

Finals

Top half

Bottom half

References

External links
 Main Draw

Women's Doubles